Jakdan (also Romanized as Jakdān and Jakadān; also known as Kalūjakadān (Persian: كلوجكدان ), Jagdān, Jogdān, and Joghdān) is a village in Jakdan Rural District, in the Central District of Bashagard County, Hormozgan Province, Iran. At the 2006 census, its population was 684, in 161 families.

References 

Populated places in Bashagard County